The RoboTuna is a robotic fish project involving a series of robotic fish designed and built by a team of scientists at the Massachusetts Institute of Technology (MIT) in the US.

The Project 

The project started in 1993. Their aim was to investigate the possibility of constructing a robotic submarine that could reproduce the way tunas swim and see if they could find a superior system of propulsion for the Autonomous Underwater Vehicles (AUVs). Their experiment was a success as they discovered that their fish was both more maneuverable and used less energy than other robotic submarines. The Science Museum in London, UK has one on display in their geophysics and oceanography section .

Improvements 
While the early results were successful the RoboTuna was not able to replicate the bursts of acceleration that real tuna were able to manage. Researchers improved the design using a genetic algorithm, in which the best systems will "get to have virtual offspring" according to researcher David Barrett. Early incarnations worked poorly but as the system evolved the RoboTuna's abilities improved. Visualization techniques showed that the system had evolved so that the RoboTuna was taking advantage of vortices that it created.  A swish of its tail one way creating a vortex, which was then used by a swish the other way - propelling it off the vortex it had created. This technique not only helps to with normal swimming but explains the impressive standing start speeds of real tuna.

The Researchers 
The team involved in the  project included: Michael Triantafyllou, David Barrett who built  the first RoboTuna (Charlie I) in 1995 for his PhD thesis, and David Beal and Michael Sachinis, who introduced several modifications including a cable-pulley system to produce RoboTuna II.

See also
Tunabot

References 

Electromechanical engineering
Robotic animals
Robots of the United States
1995 robots
Massachusetts Institute of Technology
Underwater robots
Tuna